Paniutyne is an urban-type settlement in Lozova Raion of Kharkiv Oblast in Ukraine. It is essentially a northern suburb of the city of Lozova. Paniutyne belongs to Lozova urban hromada, one of the hromadas of Ukraine.  Population: 

Until 18 July 2020, Paniutyne belonged to city of oblast significance and the center of Lozova Municipality. The municipality was abolished in July 2020 as part of the administrative reform of Ukraine, which reduced the number of raions of Kharkiv Oblast to seven. The area of Lozova Municipality was merged into Lozova Raion.

Economy

Transportation
Paniutyne railway station is on the railway connecting Kharkiv and Lozova. There is intensive passenger traffic.

The settlement has road access to Pavlohrad via Lozova and to Kharkiv.

References

Urban-type settlements in Lozova Raion